Sottile Farms was a large farm in South Florida owned by the Sottile family of Miami, and incorporated as South Dade Farms. Sottile Farms was over 30,000 acres and was owned by the Sottile family from 1930 to 1974.   Sottile Farms was created by James Sottile, an Italian-American immigrant who was one of 7 Sottile brothers that immigrated to Charleston, SC in the late nineteenth century. The Sottile family is prominent in Charleston, and a local venue, the Sottile Theater, continues their legacy. Prior to creating Sottile Farms, James Sottile owned the Isle of Palms in Charleston, SC. By the time of his death in 1964, James Sottile was one of the richest people in America.

Some of the land from Sottile farms was donated to the people of Florida by James Sottile. Sottile donated 20 acres of valuable land on the Florida East Coast Railway tracks for construction of the Florida City State Farmers Market in 1939, 80 acres for the then South Dade Labor Camp on Campbell Drive near the air base and 1,200 acres of land in 1937 for the Homestead Bayfront Park, which was not finished until after WWII. The Homestead Bayfront Park is over 1200 acres in Miami and has been called "The Real South Beach".

References 

Farms in Florida